G band may refer to:
 G band (IEEE), a millimetre wave band from 110 to 300 GHz
 G band (NATO), a radio frequency band from 4 to 6 GHz
 G banding, in cytogenetics